The Floating Landscape is a 2003 Hong Kong romance film written and directed by Carol Lai and starring Ekin Cheng, Karena Lam and Liu Ye. The film was shown in competition for the Golden Lion at the 60th Venice International Film Festival.

Plot
Man, haunted by the death of her lover, Sam, struggles to accept a new life. She goes to Qingdao in search of the landscape that her lover spoke of in his final days. There, she meets a young postman, Lit, who runs along with Man every day in the landscape search. While Lit gradually falls for Man's beauty and passion, she can only think of her lost-lover and the painting

Cast
 Karena Lam as Man
 Ekin Cheng as Sam
 Liu Ye as Lit
 CoCo Su as Landlady Tung
 Huang Jue as Wu
 Chan Wing-chiu as Gallery manager
 Keely as Bride
 Fiona Lee as Bridesmaid
 Middi Yau as Lady on phone in hospital 
 Amy Lam as Funeral make-up artist
 Wu Ji-wen as Tung's old neighbor
 Huang Suying as Tung's old neighbor
 He Yongsheng as Postman Mick
 Li Xiao as Gold Fish Dung (11 years old)
 Dong Zhihao as Boy receiving letter
 Wang Zirong as Girl hiding behind tree
 Hao Yun as Girl sending letter
 Zhou Kong as Hair-cut girl
 Xue Shuai as Dong
 Jiang Tao as New postman
 Wu Zhangxu as Landlady Tung's boyfriend
 Yu Fengqi as Hair-cut old man A
 Yin Chun-ting as Hair-cut old man B
 Liu Xiaobin as Bridegroom
 Fan Lun as Bride
 Yang Lei as Best man
 Wong Koon as Bridesmaid
 Chai Wong as Bride's girlfriend
 Li Yuanqing as Flower hawker
 Xue Shuyin as Flower woman customer
 Li Weiqing as Hair-cut customer
 Xu Li as Perm hair customer
 Wu Ge as Taxi Driver
 Chan Wai-keung as Van driver
 Li Linjing as Scarf girl
 Hu Kun as Drawing boy
 Lu Ming as Drawing boy's father
 Ma Zhuren as Female doctor
 Cheng Shu-tao as Nurse
 Du Huanhuan as Nurse
 Feng Yani as Nurse
 Qin Hua as Nurse
 Joyce Keung as Ambulance nurse
 Jiao Xin as Ambulance nurse
 Qi Baohui as Ambulance nurse
 Xu Yuedong as Postman
 Zhang Chunhua as Postman
 Jiang Hua as Postman
 Jiang Xiaokun as Postman
 Liu Chen as Postman
 Liu Yuanjia as Postman
 Hou Chengmin as Postman
 Guan Jianmin as Postman
 HUnag Huimin as Battledore team member
 Song Jianguo as Battledore team member
 Zhou Wei as Battledore team member
 Yao Kuiguang as Battledore team member
 Zhang Shenghong as Battledore team member
 Yang Lin as Battledore team member
 Liu Tao as Battledore team member
 Yan Bo as Battledore team member
 Song Jianyong as Battledore team member
 Wang Shuzhong as Battledore team member

Awards and nominations

References

External links

Review

2003 films
2003 romantic drama films
Hong Kong romantic drama films
2000s Cantonese-language films
Films with live action and animation
Films set in Shandong
Films shot in Shandong
2000s Hong Kong films